Coracocephalus is a genus of flies in the family Dolichopodidae. It includes two species distributed in Austria.

Species
Coracocephalus humilis (Loew, 1869) (synonym: Coracocephalus miki Parent, 1927)
Coracocephalus stroblii Mik, 1892

References 

Dolichopodidae genera
Hydrophorinae
Taxa named by Josef Mik
Diptera of Europe
Endemic fauna of Austria